Sinatra Sings Cole Porter is a 2008 compilation album by American singer, Frank Sinatra.

Track listing
 All songs were written by Cole Porter.
"Night and Day"
"Begin the Beguine"
"I Get a Kick Out of You"
"I Love You"
Medley: "You'd Be So Easy to Love"/"I've Got You Under My Skin"
"Don't Fence Me In"
"I Concentrate on You"
"Why Shouldn't I?"
"Just One of Those Things"
"Why Can't You Behave?"
"So in Love"
"You'd Be So Nice to Come Home To"
"Cherry Pies Ought To Be You"
"You Do Something to Me"
"I Am Loved"
"You Don't Remind Me"
"Begin the Beguine"
"Night and Day"

See also
 Frank Sinatra Sings the Select Cole Porter (1996)

2008 compilation albums
Frank Sinatra compilation albums